Merrington is the surname of the following people

Andrew Merrington (born 1978), Australian rules footballer
David Merrington (born 1945), English association football commentator, player and coach
Gary Merrington (born 1946), Australian rules footballer, father of Andrew
Marguerite Merington (1857–1951), American author

See also
 Merrington (disambiguation)

Surnames
English-language surnames
Surnames of English origin
Surnames of British Isles origin
English toponymic surnames